Jacob Naveros (fl. ca. 1533) was an early sixteenth-century Spanish logician. He is now known for his concern about the attribution of the logical works of Duns Scotus.  Naveros found inconsistencies between the logical works and Scotus' commentary on the Sentences that caused him to doubt whether he had written any of these works.

Naveros was born at the end of the 15th century, at Castronuño. He wrote a number of works in Latin.

References 

 Ashworth, E. J., 'Jacobus Naveros (fl. ca. 1533) on the Question: "Do Spoken Words Signify Concepts or Things?",' Logos and Pragma. Essays on the Philosophy of Language in Honour of Professor Gabriel Nuchelmans, ed. de Rijk and Braakhuis (Nijmegen: Ingenium, 1987): 189–214.

Notes

Scholasticism
16th-century Spanish writers
Logicians